The 1996 Nippon Professional Baseball season was the 47th season of operation for the league.

Regular season standings

Central League

Pacific League

Japan Series

See also
1996 Major League Baseball season

References

 
1996 in baseball
1996 in Japanese sport